Luka Đorđević (born 9 July 1994) is a Montenegrin professional footballer who plays as a forward for Russian club Sochi.

Club career

Zenit
On 11 August 2012, Đorđević made his first appearance for Zenit when he came in the 83rd minute as a substitute in the club's 5–0 win against Spartak Moskva.

Loan to Twente
Đorđević went on a one-season loan from Zenit to Twente in August 2013. On 11 January 2014, he scored his first goal for Twente in a friendly match against VfL Osnabrück.

Loan to Arsenal Tula
After spending the 2017–18 season on loan at FC Arsenal Tula, he rejoined Arsenal for another season-long loan on 4 August 2018. On 21 October 2018, Đorđević assisted teammate Reziuan Mirzov for the winning goal in a 3–2 upset against favorites Spartak Moscow. On 27 October 2018, he scored a goal using a mid-air heel which a journalist called a "scorpion" in a 1–1 tie with Orenburg.

Lokomotiv Moscow
On 12 August 2019, he signed with FC Lokomotiv Moscow. On 8 June 2021, his contract with Lokomotiv was terminated by mutual consent.

Arsenal Tula
On 14 October 2020, he returned to FC Arsenal Tula on loan until the end of the 2020–21 season.

Vejle
On 5 September 2021, he joined Danish club Vejle BK. After 6 goals in 26 games, Vejle confirmed in May 2022, that Đorđević would leave the club, as his contract would expire.

Sochi
On 19 September 2022, Đorđević returned to Russia and signed with Sochi.

International career
In August 2012 he participated in the Valeri Lobanovsky Memorial Tournament 2012, where his team lost in the final to  Slovakia on penalties and took home silver medals.
Đorđević received his first call-up for the Montenegro national football team on 27 August 2012 for matches against Poland and San Marino on September 7 and 11 respectively. He scored on his debut against San Marino on 11 September 2012. As of August 2020, he has earned a total of 11 caps, scoring 1 goal.

Career statistics

Club

International

International goals

Honors
Mogren
Montenegrin First League: 2010–11
Zenit Saint Petersburg
Russian Super Cup: 2016

References

External links

 
 Voetbal International profile 

1994 births
People from Budva
Living people
Association football forwards
Montenegrin footballers
Montenegro youth international footballers
Montenegro under-21 international footballers
Montenegro international footballers
FK Mogren players
FC Zenit Saint Petersburg players
Jong FC Twente players
FC Twente players
U.C. Sampdoria players
FC Zenit-2 Saint Petersburg players
SD Ponferradina players
FC Arsenal Tula players
FC Lokomotiv Moscow players
Vejle Boldklub players
PFC Sochi players
Montenegrin First League players
Russian Premier League players
Eredivisie players
Eerste Divisie players
Serie A players
Russian First League players
Segunda División players
Danish Superliga players
Montenegrin expatriate footballers
Expatriate footballers in Russia
Montenegrin expatriate sportspeople in Russia
Expatriate footballers in the Netherlands
Montenegrin expatriate sportspeople in the Netherlands
Expatriate footballers in Italy
Montenegrin expatriate sportspeople in Italy
Expatriate footballers in Spain
Montenegrin expatriate sportspeople in Spain
Expatriate men's footballers in Denmark
Montenegrin expatriate sportspeople in Denmark